Travis Minor (born June 30, 1979) is a former American football running back. He was drafted by the Miami Dolphins in the third round of the 2001 NFL Draft and also played with the St. Louis Rams. He played college football at Florida State.

Early years
Minor attended Catholic High in Baton Rouge, Louisiana and won varsity letters in football and track. In football, he finished his high school career with 4,706 rushing yards and 52 touchdowns, and 62 receptions for 1,344 yards and 20 touchdowns. As a senior, he was named the USA Today Offensive Player of the Year. He also won the Gatorade National Player of the Year for the 1996-97 season.

College career
Minor was a four-year letterman for the Florida State Seminoles where he started 33 of the 43 games in which he played during his career, including 30 starts over his final three years.  He finished his career with 3,218 yards rushing and 28 touchdowns on 664 attempts, while also catching 106 passes for 831 yards and three scores and is the school's fourth all-time leading rusher, trailing only Dalvin Cook (4,464), Warrick Dunn (3,959), and Greg Allen (3,769). He led the team in rushing all four years and was a second-team All-Atlantic Coast Conference selection as a senior when he rushed for a career-high 923 yards and five touchdowns on 181 carries, and tallied a career-best 42 receptions for 333 yards.  He played in the Senior Bowl following his senior season. Coincidentally, Travis Minor and Warrick Dunn also attended the same high school. (Catholic High, Baton Rouge) He was a sports management major.

Professional career
Minor was drafted in the third round (85th overall) by the Miami Dolphins in the 2001 NFL Draft. The St. Louis Rams signed Minor on March 7, 2007, but he was later cut.

References

External links
St. Louis Rams bio

1979 births
Living people
Players of American football from New Orleans
American football running backs
Catholic High School (Baton Rouge, Louisiana) alumni
Florida State Seminoles football players
Miami Dolphins players
St. Louis Rams players